Sally-Joy Taylor-Isherwood (born March 23, 1990 in Toronto, Ontario, Canada) is a Canadian actress.

Private life
Taylor-Isherwood is the younger sister of actress Emma Taylor-Isherwood.  She has graduated from Canterbury High School, with a focus in the dramatic arts.  Taylor-Isherwood who has dual Canadian and British citizenship is fluent in both English and French.

Career
She began her acting career at the age of 8 in the television show Revenge of the Land. The same year she acted alongside her sister Emma in Who Gets the House?.

One of her best known roles is as the current voice of Emily in Arthur after the departure of Vanessa Lengies.

She also did several voices on For Better Or For Worse and voices Alice in Upstairs, Downstairs Bears, Clementine and Melanie in Caillou and Tory in Just Jamie.

She is currently represented by the Agence Claire Boivin Agency.

Filmography
 Who Gets the House (1999) .... Amy Reece
 Revenge of the Land (1999, TV Movie) .... Lucie Hawke
 Nuremberg (2000, TV Mini-Series) .... Edda Goering
 Jackie Bouvier Kennedy Onassis (2000, TV Movie) .... Jackie Bouvier, age 8
 Chocolat (2000) .... Anouk, the daughter of Vianne (voice)
 For Better Or For Worse (2000) ... Additional Voices
 Upstairs, Downstairs Bears (2000, TV Series) .... Alice Bosworth (voice)
 Tales from the Neverending Story (2001, TV Series) .... Yonie
 Caillou (2001, TV Series) .... Clementine / Melanie (voice)
 Black Hole High (2002–2006, TV Series) .... Josie's Clone
 Arthur (2003-2015, TV Series) .... Emily (voice)
 Just Jamie (2004, TV Series) .... Tory (voice)
 A Taste of Jupiter (2005) .... Megan
 Afterwards (2008) .... Jennifer
 Aaron Stone (2009, TV Series) .... Samantha
 Overruled! (2009-2010, TV Series) .... Kaleigh 'Kali' Stewart
 Kuu Kuu Harajuku (2015-2018, TV Series) .... Music (voice)
 Sahara (2017) .... Alexandrie (English version, voice)

References

External links
 Agence Claire Boivin Agency
 

1990 births
British child actresses
British voice actresses
British television actresses
British film actresses
Canadian people of British descent
Canadian television actresses
Canadian film actresses
Living people
Actresses from Toronto
Canadian child actresses
Canadian voice actresses